The modulated complex lapped transform (MCLT) is a lapped transform, similar to the modified discrete cosine transform, that explicitly represents the phase (complex values) of the signal.

References 
 H. Malvar, "A Modulated Complex Lapped Transform And Its Applications to Audio Processing". Proc. International Conference on Acoustics, Speech and Signal Processing, 1999.
 H. Malvar, "Fast Algorithm for the Modulated Complex Lapped Transform", IEEE Signal Processing Letters, vol. 10, No. 1, 2003.

See also 
 Modified discrete cosine transform

Fourier analysis